Stade Brestois 29 or simply Brest, is a French football club based in Brest. It was founded in 1950 following the merger of five local patronages, including Armoricaine de Brest, founded in 1903.

In its early years, the club made a rapid rise in the hierarchy of regional football, to the point of being promoted to the French Amateur Championship, the third level of French football, in 1958. The club joined the Second Division in 1970, then finally reached the First Division in 1979. It experienced its sporting peak between 1981 and 1991 under the presidency of François Yvinec, playing nine seasons in the elite in ten years. In 1991, the club was demoted before filing for bankruptcy a few months later. The club only returned to the second division in 2004 and Ligue 1 in 2010. At the end of the 2012–2013 season, it had respectively thirteen and seventeen seasons in the French First and Second divisions.

The Brest club has been chaired, since 10 May 2016, by entrepreneur Denis Le Saint and led by tactician Michel Der Zakarian since 1 July 2021.

Following the 2018–19 season, the club has played in Ligue 1, the top division of French football.

History 
Sources do not agree as to the date of the club's creation. According to the version presented by the current club, it was born in 1950 from the merger of five local patronages. However, the Stade Brestois when it was created took over the structures and the place of Armoricaine de Brest, founded in 1903, of which it would therefore be the direct heir.

Armoricaine de Brest (1903–1950) 
The sports section of Saint Louis patronage was created in 1903 by taking the name of Armoricaine de Brest and adopting a motto: "Pen Huel" ("Heads up" in Breton). Before the First World War, 500 young people and 400 children attended the various patronage activities: military preparation, shooting, football, athletics, men's gymnastics, theatre, choir, brass band, study circles. The war thinned the ranks of the Armoricans but activities quickly resumed.

In 1922, Father Cozanet had a stadium built at Petit Paris, on the site of the current Stade Francis-Le Blé, a grandstand still bearing the Armorican motto (the Pen Huel stand) as its name. The stadium was inaugurated on 9 February 1923 during a meeting between the Armoricaine and the Stade Français. From the ranks of the Armorican, between the wars, French internationals Alexis Thépot, Robert Coat and Jean Guéguen emerged.

The patronage of the Armorican contested the 16th finals of the Coupe de France in 1921 and 1927, the 32nd finals in 1923, 1926, 1928, 1930, 1931 and 1935. In 1926, the Armoricaine took away the title of champion of France patronage by winning in the final against Saint-Jean-de-Luz (3-0). The goalkeeper Alexis Thépot, who obtained a selection while he was part of the Armoricaine squad in 1927 against England, is one of the club's brightest players during this period.

The rise of the Stade Brestois (1950–1982) 
In 1950, the merger initiated by Canon Balbous between five Catholic patronages (the Armoricaine de Saint-Louis, the Avenir de Saint-Martin, the Flamme du Pilier Rouge, the Milice de Saint-Michel and the Jeune de Saint-Marc) gave birth to Stade Brest. One of the objectives of this merger of Catholic teams is to supplant the great Brest club of the time, AS Brest, which is secular.

At its birth, the Stade Brestois had as President (then as Honorary President until his death in 1998) Jean Offret.

Taking over the place of Armoricaine in the first division of Brittany, the Stadium was promoted in Promotion d'honneur in 1951, in regional honour division (just created) in 1952 before joining the Honour Division (1953). Stade Brestois finally reached the French Amateur Championship (CFA) in 1958, taking advantage of the withdrawal of the Voltigeurs de Châteaubriant. The club is finally evolving at the same level as its rival AS Brest. In 1963, the club went back down to the honor division, but returned to the CFA in 1966. Continuing its rise in the hierarchy of French football, the Stade Brestois then acceded to the second division following its enlargement in 1970.

In 1979, the Stade Brestois was promoted to the Division 1 for the first time in its history. This apprenticeship year ends with a last place in the standings, but Stade goes back up the following season. The club, whose new president is called François Yvinec, is this time quite comfortably in Division 1. Despite a certain instability in the post of coach, the Breton club confirmed its place in the elite during the following seasons.

The peak with the Brest Armorique then the brutal fall (1982–1991) 
In 1983, President François Yvinec decided to change the name of the club to that of FC Brest Armorique in order to better specify the geographical location of the club. The year 1986 is a turning point in the life of the club. From this season, the Bretons embark on the path of "football-business" by recruiting South American stars, who after a fanfare debut allow them to reach a historic (and still unmatched) 8th place in Division 1 in 1987. However, behind the scenes, the rupture between the president and the coach Raymond Keruzoré leads to the resignation of the latter, then to the withdrawal of the main sponsor, the Leclerc stores.

Young Paul Le Guen, Vincent Guérin and Patrick Colleter are not enough to keep the club going, which went down to Division 2 in 1988 with its promising young generation. It was against the Racing Club de Strasbourg that they regained their place in the elite a year later after play-offs which remain as a great moment in the history of the club.

Back in the first division, the Brest team is made up of talented young players such as Corentin Martins, David Ginola, the Paraguayan Roberto Cabañas or the future world champion Stéphane Guivarc'h, who allow the club to rank well in the elite. But in 1991, despite the 11th place obtained by Brest in the league, the club's significant deficit led to its administrative relegation to the Second Division.

The club on the banks of the Penfeld ended up imploding in December of that same year. During his last match with the rival Guingamp, the invasion of the lawn by the exasperated Brest supporters forces David Ginola to call for calm so that the match can resume. The results of matches played by the club since the start of the competition are void. The club, whose liabilities are estimated at 150 million francs, filed for bankruptcy.

The professional team is dissolved, the Brest players are released. The reserve team, which then plays in the third division, becomes the pennant team.

The years in amateur championships (1991–2004) 
In 1993, the club was promoted to the brand new National 1 championship. Following the merger of the two National groups in 1997, the Stade Brestois was relegated to the French Amateur Championship, where three seasons remained.

After ten years in the amateur championships, the Breton club, which regained its original name (in 1993), went back to the National championship in 2000, where four seasons remained.

The rebirth of Stade Brestois (2004–2013) 
In 2004, led by a young Franck Ribéry, the club secured promotion to Ligue 2, the second division of French football. The club managed to stay at this level in the following years. However, Brest was not a serious candidate for promotion until the end of the decade. The 2009–10 season saw the Breton club, coached by Alex Dupont, finish in second place, which secured automatic promotion to Ligue 1, following a 2–0 victory against Tours on 30 April 2010. In addition, the team had a good run in the Coupe de France, eventually falling in the round of 16 to RC Lens in extra time.

The club managed to ensure its position in the top division, obtained on 29 May 2011 despite a defeat at home against Toulouse. During the 2011–12 season, Brest secured its place in the first division with a win over Évian on the final day of the season. It was also the club's first away win during the campaign.

Players

Current squad

Out on loan

Notable players 
Below are the notable former and current players who have represented Stade Brestois in league and international competition since the club's foundation in 1903. To appear in the section below, a player must have either played in at least 80 official matches for the club or represented their country's national team either while playing for Brest or after departing the club.
For a complete list of Stade Brestois players, see :Category:Stade Brestois 29 players.

 José Luis Brown
 Jorge Higuaín
 Júlio César
 Gérard Buscher
 Patrick Colleter
 David Ginola
 Vincent Guérin
 Stéphane Guivarc'h
 Bernard Lama
 Paul Le Guen
 Yvon Le Roux
 Corentin Martins
 Bernard Pardo
 Pascal Pierre
 Franck Ribéry
 Nolan Roux
 Roberto Cabañas
 Drago Vabec

Club officials

Coaches

Club honours

Ligue 2
Champions: 1980–81
Coupe de France
Quarter-finalist: (2) 1982–83, 2014–15
Coupe Gambardella
Winner: 1990
Division d'Honneur (Bretagne)
Champions: (4) 1966, 1972, 1977, 2005
Cup of Brittany
Winner: 1969
Championnat de France des patronages (catholic football league)
Winner: 1923

History of last 24 years

Partnership
Since September 2011, Stade Brestois 29 sponsors its amateur American counterpart in New York, Stade Brestois New York.

References

External links

Official website

 
Association football clubs established in 1950
Sport in Brest, France
1950 establishments in France
Football clubs in Brittany
Ligue 1 clubs